Totally Doctor Who is a children's television series produced by the BBC that was originally broadcast between 13 April 2006 and 29 June 2007, accompanying the second and third revived series of Doctor Who. At the time of its original broadcast, Doctor Who, a science fiction programme aimed at a family audience, had no existing children's spin-off; The Sarah Jane Adventures, of which the pilot episode was broadcast on New Year's Day, 2007, would replace the series as the only children's show based on Doctor Who until 2009 when K-9 aired.

History
The first series of the programme ran concurrently with the 2006 series of Doctor Who. Presented by Barney Harwood and Liz Barker it aired on BBC One at 5:00 p.m. on Thursdays as part of the CBBC strand, and was repeated at 6:30 p.m. on Fridays and then again on Saturdays on the CBBC Channel, just prior to the BBC One airing of the new episode of Doctor Who. There was no Totally Doctor Who episode in conjunction with the 2006 Christmas special.

The second series of Totally Doctor Who ran concurrently with the 2007 series of Doctor Who.  It aired every Friday after the broadcast of that week's Doctor Who, at 5:00 p.m. on BBC One. Again, no Totally Doctor Who episode was run in conjunction with the 2007 Christmas special. In this series Kirsten O'Brien replaced Liz Barker, who left television presenting to become a full-time mother.

The programme didn't return for a third series at the time of the fourth series of Doctor Who.

Episodes

Series 1 (2006)

Series 2 (2007)

Regular features

Behind the scenes
The show features 'behind the scenes' segments detailing the creation process of certain parts of a recent Doctor Who episode: for example, underwater filming for a weightless scene in "The Impossible Planet", or documenting the making of a TARDISODE.

Companion Academy (Series 1)
In the "Companion Academy" segment, a number of children competed in the style of a reality show to win a day behind-the-scenes during the filming of Doctor Who. The competition was originally restricted to 7- to 12-year-olds, but was subsequently extended to include ages 13 and 14. One of the judges for this segment was Clayton Hickman, editor of Doctor Who Magazine at the time.

Finale
At the end of the programme the presenters and guests review the show. The two presenters then show a preview of the next new episode of Doctor Who.

The Filing Cabinet (Series 1)
The filing cabinet contains letters, drawings and creations made by the viewers. It has a weathered, wooden-looking exterior, with Gallifreyan text on the front and is designed to look like the Doctor's TARDIS. It also has the properties of a TARDIS because it appears to be bigger on the inside (however, it is quite obviously fed through the wall; made ever more obvious by the fact that the wall behind it is semi-transparent). If a piece of work is featured on the show, its author receives a Totally Doctor Who branded mug.

Handprints (Series 2)

This is a viewer competition where every week, handprints are made from the cast and crew in very hard clay. Then, every week, the cast or crew member who made the handprint, sets a question referring to the next episode of Doctor Who. The winner was announced by the presenters of CBBC and won all the handprints made.

The Infinite Quest (Series 2)

One segment in the 2007 series of Totally Doctor Who featured the first twelve parts of an animated Doctor Who story titled "The Infinite Quest". The cartoon stars David Tennant and Freema Agyeman, voicing the Doctor and Martha respectively.  Anthony Head voices a character named "Baltazar – Scourge of the Galaxy", and Toby Longworth also provides voices. The cartoon is produced by Firestep, written by Alan Barnes and directed by Gary Russell.  The thirteenth and final part was shown in an omnibus broadcast on 29 June 2007, the day of the Series' final episode.

Interview
Every week there is a different guest who is interviewed during the programme, for example David Tennant.

Team Totally (Series 2)
Two teams of three battle it out for a "money can't buy Doctor Who experience". The two teams are Team Time Lord (Alia, Sara and Cody) and Team TARDIS (Chris, Molly and Daniel). Every week they complete a task, e.g. Story boarding, the winners are rewarded with 2 points whilst the runners-up are awarded 1 point. Molly Kabia (of Team TARDIS), played an unnamed female character in the interactive Doctor Who mini-episode 'Attack of the Graske'. However Molly never revealed this to any of her teammates . In the final episode, the prize was revealed as a weekend trip to Blackpool to meet David Tennant whilst he was there to switch on the Illuminations. Both teams also received framed art, depicting their team with the Doctor and Martha in the same art style as the show's opening titles.

Who Goes There? (Series 2)
In this challenge, the back-lit silhouette of a Doctor Who monster is shown. Viewers are encouraged to identify the monster from its shadow, and write or email the programme with the correct answer, in hopes of winning mugs and sweatshirts.

Who-ru (Series 1)
The title is a pun on the word guru. It is a Doctor Who trivia challenge between two children or a child and an actor, with a prize from one of the guests (usually a signed script or promotional photo) though both contestants receive a Totally Doctor Who goodie bag for taking part. The format of the challenge changed after the first episode, in which the loser had to give the winner a cherished possession.

References

External links
 

 Official Totally Doctor Who website
 
 
 Announcement on BBC Doctor Who website via Internet Archive
                                                                                             

Works about Doctor Who
BBC children's television shows
2000s British children's television series
2006 British television series debuts
2007 British television series endings
Doctor Who spin-offs
Television series about television
Television series by BBC Studios